Canada's Sébastien Lareau and Daniel Nestor defeated the defending gold medalists, Australia's Todd Woodbridge and Mark Woodforde, in the final, 5–7, 6–3, 6–4, 7–6(7–2) to win the gold medal in Men's Doubles tennis at the 2000 Summer Olympics. It was Canada's first men's doubles medal. The Woodies became the first pair to win multiple medals in the event, and the second and third individuals to do so (Reginald Doherty won two golds with different partners in 1900 and 1908). In the bronze medal match, Spain's Àlex Corretja and Albert Costa defeated South Africa's David Adams and John-Laffnie de Jager, 2–6, 6–4, 6–3. It was Spain's first medal at the event.

The tournament was held in the Sydney Olympic Park Tennis Centre in Sydney, Australia from 20 to 27 September 2000. There were 29 pairs from 29 nations, with each nation limited to one pair (two players).

Background

This was the 11th appearance of men's doubles tennis. The event has been held at every Summer Olympics where tennis has been on the program: from 1896 to 1924 and then from 1988 to the current program. A demonstration event was held in 1968.

Todd Woodbridge and Mark Woodforde were the defending champions, host nation heroes, number one seeds, and favorites. 1996 bronze medalist David Prinosil of Germany returned, now partnered with Tommy Haas.

Belarus made its debut in the event. Russia made its first separate appearance since 1912. Great Britain made its ninth appearance in the event, most of any nation.

Competition format

The competition was a single-elimination tournament with a bronze medal match. All matches except the final were best-of-three sets; the final was best-of-five. Tiebreaks were used for any set before the third (fifth in the final) that reached 6–6.

Schedule

All times are Australian Eastern Standard Time (UTC+10)

Seeds

The top three seeds received byes into the second round.

Competitors

Draw

Finals

Top half

Bottom half

References

ITF Olympic Site

2000
Men's doubles
Men's events at the 2000 Summer Olympics